Sărulești is a commune in Călărași County, Muntenia, Romania. It is composed of seven villages: Măgureni, Polcești, Săndulița, Sărulești, Sărulești-Gară, Sătucu and Solacolu.

As of 2002 the population of Sărulești is 3,177 inhabitants.

References

Communes in Călărași County
Localities in Muntenia